Emma Richards may refer to:

Emma Richards (sailor), British yachtswoman
Emma Richards (minister) (1927–2014), Mennonite pastor
Emma Gaggiotti Richards (1825–1912), Italian painter